FCDS may refer to:
 Fairfield Country Day School, in Connecticut, United States
 Forsyth Country Day School, in North Carolina, United States
 Family Computer Disk System, an add-on for Nintendo's Family Computer game console

See also 
 FCD (disambiguation)